Dave Syverson (born June 29, 1957) is a Republican member of the Illinois Senate representing the 35th district since 2013. Previously, he represented the 34th district from 1993 to 2013.

Early life, education and career
He was born June 29, 1957, in Chicago, Illinois, and moved to Rockford in his early childhood. He attended Guilford High School and Rock Valley College as a business major.

Illinois Senate 
Syverson was first elected to the Illinois State Senate in 1992. He joined a group of newly elected conservative State Senators called the "Fab Five". As a member of the Fab Five, along with Chris Lauzen, Steve Rauschenberger, Patrick O'Malley, and Peter Fitzgerald.

Syverson serves on the following Senate committees: Health (Minority Spokesperson); Healthcare Access and Availability (Minority Spokesperson); Insurance (Minority Spokesperson); Behavioral and Mental Health; Executive; Tourism and Hospitality; Subcommittee on Medicaid; Sub. on Managed Care Organizations; Sub. on Long-Term Care & Aging; Redistricting- Northern Illinois (Sub-Minority Spokesperson); Executive- Gaming; Executive- Tobacco.

During the 2008 Republican Party presidential primaries, Syverson worked on behalf of the presidential campaign of former U.S. Senator Fred Thompson serving as a congressional district chair for Illinois's 16th congressional district.

During his time in the Senate he has sponsored and passed over 100 of pieces of legislation aimed at improving the jobs climate in his state, reducing the size of Government, & local Government Tax Caps. In addition, he worked on many sweeping health care reforms including the legislation he sponsored, along with then State Senator Barack Obama, creating Illinois Kid Care health plan.

Personal life
In addition to his Senate Role,  Dave is a partner with Williams-Manny, Inc.,and serves on the Board of MercyHealth. He lives in Rockford and has two children. Syverson is a member of the Rockford Chamber of Commerce, Rockford Area Economic Development Council, Rockford Machine Tool Association, National Federation of Independent Business, the National Association of Financial Planners, The Board of Advisors for Zion Development Corporation and Reformer's Unanimous International. Under a Charity Fund created by the Senator, and funded by giving up portions of his salary, he has been able to raise money to build neighborhood playgrounds for schools around his Senate district.

References

External links 
 Biography, bills and committees at the 98th Illinois General Assembly
 By session: 98th, 97th, 96th, 95th, 94th, 93rd
 State Senator Dave Syverson constituency site
 
 Profile at Illinois State Senate Republicans

1957 births
Living people
Politicians from Rockford, Illinois
Republican Party Illinois state senators
21st-century American politicians